Princess Elisabeth of Denmark,  (Elisabeth Caroline-Mathilde Alexandrine Helena Olga Thyra Feodora Estrid Margrethe Désirée; 8 May 1935 – 19 June 2018) was a member of the Danish royal family. She was the only daughter and eldest child of Hereditary Prince Knud and Hereditary Princess Caroline-Mathilde of Denmark, and a first cousin of the present Danish monarch, Queen Margrethe II.

Biography

As a first cousin of Queen Margrethe II, she was 12th in the line of succession to the Danish throne at the time of her death. Held the title of Prinsesse til Danmark (literally translated as "Princess to Denmark", which is reserved for those members of the royal family in line of succession). She was the only child of Knud, Hereditary Prince of Denmark, to retain succession rights to the throne of Denmark.

Princess Elisabeth was employed in the Ministry of Foreign Affairs from 1956 to 2001 and was posted abroad a number of times.

Death
It was confirmed by the Danish Royal Court that Elisabeth had died on 19 June 2018. The funeral and cremation service of Princess Elisabeth took place on 25 June at Lyngby Church.

Honours
 Princess Elizabeth Alps in Greenland are named after her.
  Knight of the Order of the Elephant (R.E.).
  Medal of Merit in Silver (F.M.2).
  Medal for the 100th Anniversary of the Birth of King Christian X (M.M.26.sept. 1870–1970).
  Queen Ingrid Commemorative Medal (Dr.I.M.M.).
  Commemorative Medal on the Occasion of the 75th Birthday of Her Majesty Queen Margrethe (EM.16.apr.2015).
  Recipient of the Prince Henrik's Commemorative Medal

Ancestry

References

Citations

Bibliography

External links
 Royal House of Denmark
 Princess Elisabeth's profile in the official Royal House website

1935 births
2018 deaths
House of Glücksburg (Denmark)
Danish princesses
Recipients of the Medal of Merit (Denmark)
Danish women diplomats
20th-century diplomats
21st-century diplomats
20th-century Lutherans
21st-century Lutherans
Danish Lutherans
People from Copenhagen
Danish people of German descent
Danish people of Swedish descent
Danish people of Russian descent
Danish people of Dutch descent